The Quair Water is a tributary of the River Tweed in the Scottish Borders area of Scotland. Its name is related to Traquair.

Etymology
The name Quair has a Brittonic etymology. It may be derived from the element *wejr (<*wẹ:drā) meaning "a bend, something curved or twisted" (c.f. Middle Welsh gweir, Welsh gwair, gwŷr; in compounds). The name could also descend from *wẹ:Σ- or *wiΣ, both forms of the root *wei which has a basic sense of "flowing", with the suffix  –urā-.

Quair may share an etymology with the rivers Wear and Wyre in Northern England, as well as the river-names preserved in place-names like Troqueer in Kirkcudbrightshire.

See also
List of places in the Scottish Borders
List of places in Scotland
List of rivers of Scotland

References

External links
RCAHMS/Canmore record for Quair Water, Helvellyn
Geograph photo: Quair Water

1Quair